Volokonovka is a rural locality (a selo) in Bondarevskoye Rural Settlement, Kantemirovsky  District, Voronezh Oblast, Russia. The population was 638 as of 2010. There are 11 streets.

Geography 
Volokonovka is located 54 km northwest of Kantemirovka (the district's administrative centre) by road. Novobelaya is the nearest rural locality.

References 

Rural localities in Kantemirovsky District